The Los Angeles Open was a golf tournament on the LPGA Tour, played only in 1955. It was played at the Inglewood Country Club in Inglewood, California. Louise Suggs won the event.

References

Former LPGA Tour events
Golf in California
Sports competitions in Los Angeles County, California
Women's sports in California